Weltevredenpark is a suburb of Roodepoort, South Africa adjacent to Johannesburg. It is situated roughly between Beyers Naudé Drive and Hendrik Potgieter Road.

Being one of the older suburbs in the North of Johannesburg, it is well established, although keeping up with the area's current high growth rate has been a problem for developers and residents.

References

Johannesburg Region C